The Ruthenian Voivodeship (Latin: Palatinatus russiae, Polish: Województwo ruskie, Ukrainian: Руське воєводство, romanized: Ruske voievodstvo), also called  Rus’ voivodeship, was a voivodeship of the Crown of the Kingdom of Poland from 1434 until the 1772 First Partition of Poland with a center in the city of Lviv. Together with a number of other voivodeships of southern and eastern part of the Kingdom of Poland, it formed Lesser Poland Province of the Polish Crown, with its capital city in Kraków. Following the Partitions of Poland, most of Ruthenian Voivodeship, except for its northeastern corner, was annexed by the Habsburg monarchy, as part of the province of Galicia. Today, the former Ruthenian Voivodeship is divided between Poland and Ukraine.

History 

Following the Galicia–Volhynia Wars, the Kingdom of Galicia–Volhynia was divided between Poland and Lithuania. In 1349 the Polish portion was transformed into the Ruthenian domain of the Crown, while the Duchy of Volhynia was held by Prince Lubart. With the death of Casimir III the Great, the Kingdom of Poland was passed on to the Kingdom of Hungary and the Ruthenian domain was governed by Ruthenian starosta general, one of whom was Wladyslaw of Opole.

The voivodeship was created in 1434 based on the 1430 Jedlnia-Cracow Privilege on territory that belonged to the Kingdom of Galicia–Volhynia. Between 1349 and 1434, the territory along with the Western Podolie was known as Ruthenian Domain of the Crown and in such manner the King of Poland were titled as the Lord of Ruthenian lands. Western Podolie was added to the domain in 1394. In 1434 on territory of the domain were created Ruthenian Voivodeship and Podolian Voivodeship.

In Polish sources, western outskirts of the region was called Ziemia czerwieńska, or "Czerwień Land", from the name of Cherven, a town that existed there. Today there are several towns with this name, none of them related to Red Ruthenia.

This area was mentioned for the first time in 981, when Volodymyr the Great of Kievan Rus' took it over on the way into Poland. In 1018 it attached to Poland and 1031 back to Kievan Rus'. For approximately 150 years it existed as the independent Principality of Halych and Kingdom of Galicia–Volhynia (also known as the Kingdom of Rus'), before being conquered by Casimir III of Poland in 1349. Since these times the name Ruś Czerwona is recorded, translated as "Red Ruthenia" ("Czerwień" means red in Slavic languages, or from the Polish village Czermno), applied to a territory extended up to Dniester River, with priority gradually transferred to Przemyśl. Since the times of Władysław II Jagiełło, the Przemyśl voivodeship was called Ruthenian Voivodeship, with its center eventually transferred to Lwów. It consisted of five lands: Lwów, Sanok, Halych, Przemyśl, and Chełm. The territory was controlled by the Austrian Empire from 1772 to 1918, when it was known as the Kingdom of Galicia and Lodomeria.

Zygmunt Gloger, in his monumental book Historical Geography of the Lands of Old Poland, provides this description of the Ruthenian Voivodeship:

In the 10th and 11th centuries, Przemysl and Czerwien were the largest gords in this region. Later on, Halych emerged as the capital of the province, while the city of Lwów was founded only in 1250. In ca. 1349, King Casimir III of Poland took control over Principality of Halych. The province was governed by royal starostas, the first one of whom was a man named Jasiek Tarnowski. Most probably in final years of reign of King Władysław II Jagiełło, it was named the Ruthenian Voivodeship, as at that time the voivodes of Przemysl began calling themselves the voivodes of Rus'. Firs such voivode was Jan Mezyk of Dabrowa.

The Ruthenian Voivodeship consisted of five ziemias: those of Lwów, Przemysl, Sanok, Halych and Chelm. The two last ones had their own local authorities; furthermore, the Land of Chelm was completely separated from other Ruthenian lands by the Belz Voivodeship. Therefore, we should speak separately of four Ruthenian lands, and the Land of Chelm, whose history was much different after the Partitions of Poland (...) The lands of Lwow, Przemysl and Sanok had their sejmiks, which took place in their respective capitals. General sejmiks for these three lands were at Sadowa Wisznia, where seven deputies were elected to the Polish Sejm: two from each land, and one from the County of Zydaczow. Starostas resided at Lwów, Zhydachiv, Przemysl and Sanok. The voivodeship had six senators: the Archbishop of Lwow, the Bishop of Przemysl, the Voivode of Ruthenia, the Castellan of Lwow, and Castellans of Przemysl and Sanok (...) The city of Lwów was the seat of a separate Lesser Poland Tribunal for the voivodeships of Ruthenia, Kijow, Volhynia, Podolia, Belz, Braclaw and Czernihow (...) The County of Zydaczow, even though officially part of Lwow Land, was often regarded as a separate ziemia, with its own coat of arms, granted in 1676. In that years, Lwow Land had 618 villages and 42 towns, while County of Zydaczow had 170 villages and 9 towns.

The Land of Przemysl was divided into two counties: those of Przemysl and Przeworsk. In 1676, the County of Przemysl had 657 villages and 18 towns, while the County of Przeworsk had 221 villages and 18 towns (...) The Land of Sanok, located in the Carpathian Foothills, was not divided into counties. In 1676, it had 371 villages and 12 towns (...)

The Land of Halicz, with its own separate local government, was divided into the counties of Trembowla, Halicz and Kolomyja. It had its own sejmik at Halicz, where six deputies were elected to the Polish Sejm (two from each county), also one deputy to the Crown Tribunal and one to the Treasury Tribunal at Radom. The Land of Halicz had one senator, and starostas, who resided in Halicz, Trembowla, Kolomuja, Tlumacz, Rohatyn, Jablonow, Sniatyn, Krasnopol, and other locations. In 1676, it had 565 villages and 38 towns. 
 
The Land of Chelm was an enclave, separated from Ruthenian Voivodeship by Belz Voivodeship. The Bug river divided this land into two parts, and since the 10th century, Chelm was contested by Poland and Rus. In the course of the time, the Lithuanians also joined the conflict. It was ended in 1377, when King Louis annexed Chelm. The Land of Chelm had its own local offices, and a sejmik, where two deputies to the Sejm and one deputy to the Lesser Poland Tribunal were elected. It was divided into counties of Chelm and Krasnystaw, starostas resided in Chelm, Krasnystaw, Ratno, Luboml, Hrubieszow, and other locations. The Land of Chelm had two senators: the Bishop of Chelm and the Castellan of Chelm. In 1676, there were 427 villages and 23 towns in both counties (...) Southern part of the Land of Chelm belonged to the vast Zamoyski Family Fee Tail, which stretched beyond the region, into Urzedow County of Lublin Voivodeship.

Municipal government 
Seat of the Voivodeship Governor (Wojewoda): 
 Lwów

Regional Sejmik (sejmik generalny) for all Ruthene lands 
 Sądowa Wisznia

Seats of Regional Sejmik (sejmik poselski i deputacki): 
 Lwów
 Halicz
 Sądowa Wisznia
 Przemyśl
 Sanok
 Chełm

Administrative division

 Chełm Land (Ziemia Chełmska), Chełm
 Chełm County, (Powiat Chełmski), Chełm
 Hrubieszów County, (Powiat Hrubieszowski), Hrubieszów
 Krasnystaw County, (Powiat Krasnystawski), Krasnystaw
 Luboml County, (Powiat Lubomelski), Luboml
 Ratno County, (Powiat Ratneński), Ratno
 Halych Land (Ziemia Halicka), Halicz
 Halicz County, (Powiat Halicki), Halicz
 Kolomyja County, (Powiat Kołomyjski), Kolomyja
 Trembowla County, (Powiat Trembowelski), Trembowla (later transferred to Podolie Voivodeship)
 Lwów Land (Ziemia Lwowska), Lwów
 Lwów County, (Powiat Lwowski), Lwów
 Żydaczów County, (Powiat Żydaczowski), Żydaczów
 Przemyśl Land (Ziemia Przemyska), Przemyśl
 Przemyśl County (Powiat Przemyski), Przemyśl
 Sambor County, (Powiat Samborski), Sambor
 Drohobycz County, (Powiat Drohobycki), Drohobycz
 Stryj County, (Powiat Stryjski), Stryj
 Sanok Land (Ziemia Sanocka), Sanok
 Sanok County (Powiat Sanocki), Sanok

Voivods 
 Stanisław Chodecki de Chotcza, (from 1466–1474)
 Jakub Buczacki – from 1501
 Stanisław Kmita de Wiśnicz, (from 1500 -)
 Jan Odrowąż, (from 1510 -)
 Jan Tarnowski (from April 2, 1527)
 Stanisław Odrowąż (from 1542)
 Piotr Firlej (1545–1553)
 Hieronim Jarosz Sieniawski (from 1576)
 Jan Daniłowicz de Olesko, (from 1605)
 Stanisław Lubomirski, (1628–1638)
 Jakub Sobieski (from June 1641)
 Jeremi Michał Wiśniowiecki (from April 1646 to 1651)
 Stefan Czarniecki (from 1651)
 Stanisław Jan Jabłonowski (from 1664)
 Jan Stanisław Jabłonowski, (1697–1731)
 August Aleksander Czartoryski (from 1731)
 Stanisław Szczęsny Potocki (from 1782)

Neighboring voivodeships and regions 
 Kraków Voivodeship
 Sandomierz Voivodeship
 Brzesc Litewski Voivodeship
 Wolhynian Voivodeship
 Bełz Voivodeship
 Podole Voivodeship
 Moldavia
 Zemplín
 Uzh county
 Máramaros

See also
 Lesser Poland
 Voivodeships of Poland
 Lendians

Notes

Sources
“Monumenta Poloniae Historica” (Digital copy)
Akta grodzkie i ziemskie z archiwum ziemskiego. Lauda sejmikowe. Tom XXIII, XXIV, XXV. (Digital edition)
Słownik geograficzny Królestwa Polskiego (Digital edition)
Central European Superpower, Henryk Litwin, BUM Magazine, October 2016.
 Lustracja województwa ruskiego, podolskiego i bełskiego, 1564–1565 Warszawa, (I) edition 2001, pages 289. 
 Lustracje dóbr królewskich XVI-XVIII wieku. Lustracja województwa ruskiego 1661–1665. Część III ziemie halicka i chełmska. Polska Akademia Nauk – Instytut Historii. 1976
 Lustracje województw ruskiego, podolskiego i bełskiego 1564–1565, wyd. K. Chłapowski, H. Żytkowicz, cz. 1, Warszawa – Łódź 1992
 Lustracje województwa ruskiego 1661–1665, wyd. E. i K. Artanowscy, cz. 3, Ziemia halicka i chełmska, Warszawa 1976
 Lustracja województwa ruskiego 1661–1665, cz. 1: Ziemia przemyska i sanocka, wyd. K. Arłamowski i w. Kaput, Wrocław-Warszawa-Kraków. 1970

External links
 Ruthenian Voivodeship, description by Zygmunt Gloger

 
Voivodeships of the Polish–Lithuanian Commonwealth
Geographic history of Ukraine
History of Galicia (Eastern Europe)
1366 establishments in Europe
14th-century establishments in Poland
1772 disestablishments in the Polish–Lithuanian Commonwealth
History of Red Ruthenia
Early Modern history of Ukraine